Hydriastele microcarpa (formerly Gulubia microcarpa) is a species of flowering plant in the family Arecaceae. It is found only in Fiji where it is threatened by habitat loss.

References

Areceae
Endemic flora of Fiji
Vulnerable plants
Taxonomy articles created by Polbot
Taxobox binomials not recognized by IUCN